Hemilepistus schirasi is a species of woodlouse that lives in and around the deserts of central and southern Iran. It can be distinguished from other species of Hemilepistus in Iran by the pattern of tubercles on the head. H. schirasi has six large tubercles in a semicircle, and rows of three tubercles extending to the outside corners of the head; other species have more tubercles, in different arrangements.

References

Trachelipodidae
Fauna of the Middle East
Crustaceans of Asia
Crustaceans described in 1970